Juan Pablo Montoya Roldán is a Colombian racing driver. Montoya is one of three drivers to win at least one race in Indy car racing, Formula One, and the NASCAR Cup Series. He is also one of only two active drivers who have won two legs of the Triple Crown of Motorsport in its more recent definition.

Career summary

Complete International Formula 3000 results
(key) (Races in bold indicate pole position; races in italics indicate fastest lap)

CART Championship Series
(key) (Races in bold indicate pole position; races in italics indicate fastest lap)

IndyCar Series
(key) (Races in bold indicate pole position; races in italics indicate fastest lap)

a Montoya lost the title to Scott Dixon on a tiebreaker, after both tied on 556 points. He won two races compared to Dixon's three.

Indianapolis 500 results

Indianapolis 500 records

Complete Formula One results
(key) (Races in bold indicate pole position; races in italics indicate fastest lap)

† Did not finish, but was classified as he had completed more than 90% of the race distance.

Formula One records 

NASCAR
(key) (Bold – Pole position awarded by qualifying time. Italics – Pole position earned by points standings or practice time. * – Most laps led.)

Sprint Cup Series

Daytona 500

Nationwide Series

ARCA Re/Max Series
(key) (Bold – Pole position awarded by qualifying time. Italics – Pole position earned by points standings or practice time. * – Most laps led.)

Grand-Am

Daytona Prototype
Bold – Pole Position. (Overall Finish/Class Finish).

Complete IMSA SportsCar Championship results

Complete 24 Hours of Le Mans results

Complete FIA World Endurance Championship results
(key) (Races in bold indicate pole position) (Races in italics indicate fastest lap)

Complete European Le Mans Series results

References

Juan Pablo Montoya at Driver Database 
Juan Pablo Montoya at Racing-Reference

Montoya, Juan Pablo